Anyang Gymnasium is an arena in Anyang, South Korea. It is the home arena of the Anyang KGC of the Korean Basketball League.

References

Basketball venues in South Korea
Indoor arenas in South Korea
Anyang KGC